WHNY-FM (104.7 MHz) is a radio station licensed to serve Henry, Tennessee, United States. The station is owned by Forever Media, through licensee Forever South Licenses, LLC.

WHNY-FM broadcasts a country music format.

The station was assigned the WMUF-FM call sign by the Federal Communications Commission on June 1, 1998. On September 20, 2010, the station changed its call sign to WRQR, and again on October 8, 2011, to WMUF. On July 1, 2019, the station changed its call sign to WHNY, and then to WHNY-FM on December 23, 2019.

On March 2, 2020, WHNY-FM rebranded as "Big Henry" and shifted its format from country music to classic country in a simulcast with sister station WHNY.

Previous logo

References

External links
WHNY-FM official website

HNY-FM
Country radio stations in the United States
Radio stations established in 2000
Henry County, Tennessee
2000 establishments in Tennessee